
Gmina Joniec is a rural gmina (administrative district) in Płońsk County, Masovian Voivodeship, in east-central Poland. Its seat is the village of Joniec, which lies approximately 14 kilometres (8 mi) east of Płońsk and 50 km (31 mi) south-east of Warsaw.

Villages
Gmina Joniec contains the villages and settlements of Adamowo, Joniec, Joniec-Kolonia, Józefowo, Krajęczyn, Królewo, Ludwikowo, Nowa Wrona, Omięciny, Osiek, Popielżyn Górny, Popielżyn-Zawady, Proboszczewice, Sobieski, Soboklęszcz, Stara Wrona and Szumlin.

Neighbouring gminas
Gmina Joniec is bordered by the gminas of Nasielsk, Nowe Miasto, Płońsk, Sochocin, Zakroczym and Załuski.

References

Polish official population figures 2006

Joniec
Płońsk County